Pio La Torre (24 December 1927 – 30 April 1982) was a leader of the Italian Communist Party (Partito Comunista Italiano, PCI). He was killed by the Mafia after he initiated a law that introduced a new crime in the Italian legal system, mafia conspiracy, and the possibility for the courts to seize and to confiscate the assets of the persons belonging to the mafia conspiracy.

Peasant leader
La Torre was born in Rocca Tagliata in the outskirts of Palermo as the son of peasants. He paid his studies as a construction worker. His political activities started as a leader of the peasant movement on Sicily, first in the Confederterra, later on as the regional secretary of the Italian General Confederation of Labour (Cgil) and finally within the Italian Communist Party (PCI).

In 1948 La Torre replaced peasant leader Placido Rizzotto in Corleone who was killed by the Mafia of Luciano Leggio. In March 1950 the young student La Torre was arrested in Bisacquino while leading the fight of peasants for land reform through occupations of large estates. He spent 18 months in jail in preventive custody before being released. In 1960 he became a member of the Central Committee of the PCI, and in 1962 he was elected as the regional secretary of the party for Sicily.

In Parliament
La Torre was elected in the Italian Chamber of Deputies (Italian: Camera dei Deputati) for the district of Palermo in May 1972. He was re-elected twice and remained a deputy until he was killed by the Mafia on April 30, 1982. La Torre became a member of the Antimafia Commission, formed in 1962 during the First Mafia War, which published its final report in 1976. La Torre, together with judge Cesare Terranova, wrote a minority report, which pointed to links between the Mafia and prominent politicians in particular of the Christian Democrat party (DC - Democrazia Cristiana).

On 31 March 1980, La Torre initiated a draft law that introduced a new crime in the Italian legal system, mafia conspiracy, and the possibility for the courts to seize and to confiscate the goods of the persons belonging to the mafia conspiracy.

With the inclusion of the mafia conspiracy in article 416 bis of the Italian Penal Code, a serious gap was filled. In spite of its obvious danger, mafia conspiracy had not been recognized by the Penal Code as a criminal phenomenon. As a result, many judges had not considered the Mafia a criminal association. The provisions contained in article 416 of the Penal Code concerning mafia-type association were suitable to cope with local and limited phenomena of associated delinquency, but not with organized crime.

Return to Sicily
In 1981 La Torre requested of the party that he be sent back to Sicily where he became the regional secretary of the PCI. He also became part of the popular movement against the deployment of Ground Launched Cruise Missiles (GLCM) by the United States at Comiso Air Base, just like the journalist Giuseppe Fava. The missiles were stationed in June 1983, but were dismantled after the Intermediate-Range Nuclear Forces Treaty (INF) was signed by the former Soviet Union and the United States on 8 December 1987. The last 16 GLCMs left the Comiso Air Base in 1991.

Killed by the Mafia

Before his new anti-Mafia law was approved in Parliament, La Torre was killed by the Corleonesi, which were engaged in a fierce internal war against rival Mafia factions (the so-called Second Mafia War) and against those representatives of the state that tried to seriously fight Cosa Nostra.

On 30 April 1982, La Torre and his driver Rosario Di Salvo were shot in a hail of bullets near the Communist Party's headquarters in Palermo. Their car was trapped in a one-way street blocked by the killers' car. Di Salvo returned the fire with a .38-caliber pistol before he was killed. The hit team was composed of Pino Greco, Giuseppe Lucchese, Nino Madonia, Mario Prestifilippo and Salvatore Cucuzza. La Torre was sentenced to death by the Sicilian Mafia Commission because of his endeavour against the Mafia.

The day after General Carlo Alberto Dalla Chiesa was appointed as prefect for Palermo to stop the violence of the Second Mafia War. La Torre's law was approved only after Dalla Chiesa was murdered as well on September 3, 1982, on the orders of Mafia boss Salvatore Riina of the Corleonesi. That compelled Parliament to adopt the law La Torre initiated in a rush together with other emergency measures against the Mafia.

Antimafia law
The so-called Rognoni-La Torre Law (named after the backers of two proposals that were later unified, the Christian Democrat Minister Virginio Rognoni and Pio La Torre) or "Antimafia law", includes two fundamental innovations:
(a) The introduction in the legal system of a new crime, the mafia conspiracy;
(b) The possibility for the courts to seize and to confiscate the goods of the persons belonging to the mafia conspiracy, as well as of relatives, partners and cohabitants who in the past five years played a "front man" role or cover-up role for the mafia.
The Rognoni-La Torre Law granted the judiciary better access to bank records in order to follow money trails, allowed the state to seize and confiscate the assets of convicted mafiosi, and defined membership of the Mafia as a crime independent of other criminal acts. Instead of just participating in Mafia activities, being associated with the Mafia in any way was a criminal offense.

Article 416 of the Italian Penal Code that has its origins in the fascist period (1930), defined simple organized crime on the basis of the presence of three elements: the associative bond, the organized structure, the criminal program. Organized crime of the mafia-type presents additional specific characteristics: the associative bond has such an intimidating capacity to cause subjection and omertà. It is at such a level that it may be considered a system, an absolute rule of obedience and a law of silence that first of all demands, from the entire population, the refusal to collaborate with law enforcement. An actual submission to the power of the mafia.

According to article 416 bis, introduced by the new law:
The organization is of the mafia-type when its components use intimidation, subjection and, consequentially, silence (omertà), to commit crimes, directly or indirectly acquire the management or the control of businesses, concessions, authorizations, public contracts and public services to obtain either unjust profits or advantages for themselves or others.

The new Law was used by judge Giovanni Falcone to prosecute the Sicilian Mafia in the Maxi Trial that started in 1986.

Trial of the killers
On 12 April 1995, Michele Greco, Totò Riina, Bernardo Brusca, Bernardo Provenzano, Pippo Calò, Francesco Madonia and Nenè Geraci were sentenced to life imprisonment for the murder.

The Comiso Airport was dedicated to Pio La Torre.

See also
List of victims of the Sicilian Mafia

References

External links
 Schneider, Jane C. & Peter T. Schneider (2003). Reversible Destiny: Mafia, Antimafia, and the Struggle for Palermo, Berkeley and Los Angeles, California: University of California Press
 Un libro su Pio La Torre, Centro Siciliano di Documentazione "Giuseppe Impastato".
 Raccolta di articoli su Pio La Torre
 Sito del Centro studi ed iniziative culturali Pio La Torre
 Omicidio di Pio La Torre e Rosario Di Salvo

1927 births
1982 deaths
Antimafia
People murdered by the Corleonesi
Italian Communist Party politicians
20th-century Italian politicians
Assassinated Sicilian politicians
People murdered in Italy